Colonel James Gardiner (11 January 168821 September 1745) was a Scottish soldier who fought in the British Army, including during the 1745 Jacobite rising, in which he was killed at the Battle of Prestonpans.

Life
Gardiner was born at Carriden, educated in Linlithgow, and joined the army at the age of fourteen. He served with distinction in several battles and was promoted through the ranks to Colonel in 1743.

Known as a rake in his youth, Gardiner had a religious experience in 1719 and became devout. In 1726 he married Frances Erskine, daughter to David Erskine, 9th Earl of Buchan; five of their 13 children survived to adulthood.

During the Battle of Ramillies he was shot through the mouth and nearly killed by a French soldier who had returned to plunder the dead. However, Gardiner was spared after being mistaken for a French soldier.

At the Battle of Prestonpans he was mortally wounded by the Highlanders after his dragoons had fled the field and he was attempting to rally some foot soldiers. He received a mortal blow whilst wounded on the ground and was stripped to the waist as his possessions were looted by the Highlanders. After the battle Gardiner was carried from the field by a servant to nearby Tranent where he soon died. By a quirk of fate Gardiner lived close to the battlefield in Bankton House.

Memorials
An influential biography was written by Philip Doddridge. He is commemorated locally with a memorial obelisk, erected by public subscription in 1853 in the grounds of Bankton House. A late twentieth century monument on the battlefield marks approximately where he fell.

The play, Colonel Gardiner: Vice and Virtue, written by playwright Andrew Dallmeyer was performed as part of Prestonpans' 2009 Homecoming celebrations. He features as a character in Walter Scott's novel Waverley, in which Edward Waverley briefly serves as an officer in his dragoon regiment towards the start of the Jacobite uprising. In the novel he is described as "tall, handsome and active, though somewhat advanced in years".

References

External links

Gutenberg Project: The Life of Col. James Gardiner by Philip Doddridge
Full biography at Electric Scotland
Evangelical Times: The surprising story of Colonel James Gardiner (1688–1745), by Faith Cook

Scottish soldiers
7th Queen's Own Hussars officers
6th (Inniskilling) Dragoons officers
13th Hussars officers
British military personnel of the War of the Spanish Succession
British Army personnel of the Jacobite rising of 1745
Scottish military personnel killed in action
1688 births
1745 deaths
People of the Jacobite rising of 1715
People from Bo'ness
17th-century Scottish people
18th-century Scottish people
18th-century British Army personnel